Kiraz is a town and district of İzmir Province of Turkey.

The town is approximately 148 km away from downtown Izmir. The population is 10,051. This  province has nearly 53 villages. Agriculture is major job opportunity for villagers.

References

Populated places in İzmir Province